The Newbury Weekly News is an English local weekly newspaper, covering Newbury and West Berkshire.  The paper's website is known as Newbury Today.  It is published by the Newbury Weekly News Group.

History 

The newspaper was first published in 1867 by Walter Blacket and Thomas Wheildon Turner.  It has been independently and family-owned since its establishment, with Blacket Turner & Co being formed in the 1980s.

The paper celebrated its 150th anniversary in February 2017 with a special edition including a reprint of the first Newbury Weekly News newspaper.

On 1 May 2019, the paper was sold to Iliffe Media Group.

Circulation 
In the company's certificate of circulation (circulation published in February 2016 by the Audit Bureau of Circulations), the average circulation per issue was 13,810.

Awards 
In 2006, the newspaper won The Newspaper Society's Best Paid-For Weekly Newspaper award.  The newspaper's website was voted Best Website Produced by a Weekly Newspaper. 

In 2007, Newbury Today was named the Picture Editors’ Newspaper Website of the Year, an award it shared with The Sun. 

In 2019, Newbury Weekly News won the Society of Editor’s Regional Press Awards  Best paid for weekly newspaper (circulation above 10000) category.  A NWN photographer was also shortlisted for the Weekly Photographer of the Year at the event.

References

External links 
 Newbury Today

Publications established in 1867
Weekly newspapers published in the United Kingdom
Newbury, Berkshire
1867 establishments in England
Newspapers published in Berkshire